The 1999 PGA Tour season was played from January 7 to November 7. The season consisted of 47 official money events. Tiger Woods led the tour with eight victories and there were nine first-time winners. The tournament results, leaders, and award winners are listed below.

After caddie Garland Dempsey collapsed at the Western Open in early July, the PGA Tour allowed male caddies, on a trial basis, to wear shorts on extremely hot days. Two years earlier, the USGA changed its policy and allowed caddies to wear shorts at the U.S. Open in June 1997. The shorts dispute had surfaced at the PGA Championship in August 1996 as a gender equity issue, as female caddies were allowed to wear them, but not males.

Schedule
The following table lists official events during the 1999 season.

Unofficial events
The following events were sanctioned by the PGA Tour, but did not carry official money, nor were wins official.

Location of tournaments

Money leaders
The money list was based on prize money won during the season, calculated in U.S. dollars.

Awards

Notes

References

External links
PGA Tour official site

PGA Tour seasons
PGA Tour